Dobri means good in several Slavic languages and may refer to
Dobri (given name)
Dobri dol (disambiguation)
Dobri Do (disambiguation)
Dobri, Hungary, a village
Dobri Dub, a village in Serbia
Dobri Laki, a village in Bulgaria
Novigrad na Dobri, a village in Croatia
 Don Dobri Airport in Chile
Dobri Isak, a former Yugoslav post-punk/darkwave band 
Dobří holubi se vracejí, a 1987 Czech dark comedy

See also
Dobry (disambiguation)